The 2022 NCAA Division I softball tournament was held from May 20 through June 9, 2022, as the final part of the 2022 NCAA Division I softball season. The tournament culminated with the 2022 Women's College World Series at USA Softball Hall of Fame Stadium in Oklahoma City.

Format
A total of 64 teams entered the tournament, with 32 of them receiving an automatic bid by either winning their conference's tournament or by finishing in first place in their conference. The remaining 32 bids were issued at-large, with selections extended by the NCAA Selection Committee.

Bids
The Big West, Mountain West, Pac-12 and West Coast Conference bids were awarded to the regular-season champion. All other conferences had their automatic bid go to the conference tournament winner.

Automatic

At-large

By conference

National seeds
16 National Seeds were announced on the Selection Show, on Sunday, May 15 at 7 p.m. EDT on ESPN2. Teams in italics advanced to Super Regionals. Teams in bold advanced to the Women's College World Series.

1. Oklahoma

2. 

3. 

4. 

5. UCLA

6. 

7. 

8. Arizona State

9. 

10. Clemson

11. 

12. 

13. Washington

14. 

15. 

16.

Regionals and Super Regionals
The Regionals took place May 20–22. The Super Regionals took place May 26–29.

Norman Super Regional

Tempe Super Regional

Los Angeles Super Regional

Fayetteville Super Regional

Blacksburg Super Regional

Stanford Super Regional
Played at Boyd & Jill Smith Family Stadium in Stanford, California

Stillwater Super Regional

Starkville Super Regional
Played at Nusz Park in Starkville, Mississippi

Women's College World Series
The Women's College World Series was held June 2 through June 9 in Oklahoma City.

Participants

Bracket

Game results

Championship game

All-tournament Team
The following players were members of the Women's College World Series All-Tournament Team.

Record by conference

Media coverage

Radio
For the second consecutive year Westwood One provided nationwide radio coverage of every game in the Women's College World Series. Ryan Radtke and Leah Amico returned as two of the broadcasters. Chris Plank and Destinee Martinez worked select games, while Radtke and Amico called the Championship Series.

Television
ESPN held exclusive rights to the tournament. The network aired games across ABC, ESPN, ESPN2, ESPNU, ESPN+, SEC Network, Longhorn Network, and ACC Network. For just the fifth time in the history of the women's softball tournament, ESPN covered every regional.

Broadcast assignments

Regionals
Norman: Tiffany Greene & Erin Miller
Tallahassee: Mike Couzens & Kayla Braud
Blacksburg: Pam Ward & Jenny Dalton-Hill
Fayetteville: Eric Frede & Madison Shipman
Los Angeles: Trey Bender & Kenzie Fowler
Tuscaloosa: Alex Perlman & Francesca Enea
Stillwater: Alex Loeb & Cat Osterman
Tempe: Eric Collins & Michele Smith
Super Regionals
Norman: Pam Ward & Jenny Dalton-Hill
Blacksburg: Eric Frede, Madison Shipman & Jalyn Johnson
Fayetteville: Beth Mowins, Jessica Mendoza, Michele Smith & Holly Rowe
Los Angeles: Courtney Lyle & Danielle Lawrie
Women's College World Series
Beth Mowins, Jessica Mendoza, Michele Smith & Holly Rowe (afternoons)
Kevin Brown, Amanda Scarborough & Andraya Carter (evenings)

Regionals
Evanston: Matt Schumacker & Jennie Ritter
Clemson: Jenn Hildreth & Carol Bruggeman
Knoxville: Courtney Lyle & Danielle Lawrie
Durham: Clay Matvick & Brittany McKinney
Seattle: Mark Neely & Amanda Scarborough
Gainesville: Sam Gore & Sierra Romero
Columbia: Angel Gray & Tori Vidales
Orlando: Tyler Denning & Nicole Mendes
Super Regionals
Stillwater: Kevin Brown, Amanda Scarborough & Andraya Carter
Tempe: Mike Couzens & Kayla Braud
Starkville: Tiffany Greene & Erin Miller
Stanford: Mark Neely & Carol Bruggeman
Women's College World Series Finals
Beth Mowins, Jessica Mendoza, Michele Smith & Holly Rowe

References

NCAA Division I softball tournament
Tournament